The Raveneliaceae are a family of rust fungi in the order Pucciniales. The family contains 26 genera and about 323 species.

Genera
Allotelium
Anthomyces
Anthomycetella
Apra
Bibulocystis
Cumminsina
Cystomyces
Diabole
Diabolidium
Dicheirinia
Diorchidiella
Diorchidium
Endoraecium
Esalque
Hapalophragmium
Kernkampella
Lipocystis
Nyssopsora
Ravenelia
Reyesiella
Sphaerophragmium
Sphenospora
Spumula
Triphragmiopsis
Triphragmium
Ypsilospora

References

Pucciniales
Basidiomycota families